Ginowan City Gymnasium is an arena in Ginowan, Okinawa, Japan.

Facilities
Arena - 1,917m2

References

Basketball venues in Japan
Indoor arenas in Japan
Ryukyu Golden Kings
Sports venues in Okinawa Prefecture
Sports venues completed in 1986
1986 establishments in Japan